USCGC Hollyhock (WLB-214) is a  Juniper-class cutter of the United States Coast Guard.

A seagoing buoy tender, Hollyhock was built by Marinette Marine Corporation and launched on January 25, 2003. Hollyhock is currently assigned to Port Huron, Michigan as its home port. Hollyhock was named after a previous cutter of the same name that served the USCG from 1937 to 1982.

Hollyhock is designed as a multi-mission vessel, with its missions being aids to navigation, icebreaking, search and rescue, law enforcement, and marine environmental protection. Today, the Juniper tenders conduct almost as much law enforcement as aid to navigation work.

History

Collision with the Mesabi Miner

On the morning of January 5, 2014 Hollyhock was breaking ice for the lake freighter Mesabi Miner approximately 22 nautical miles west of the Straits of Mackinac.  She slowed after encountering harder ice and was struck in the stern by the much larger ore carrier.  Both vessels sustained damage but there were no injuries, release of pollutants, or reports of flooding.

As of January 11, 2014 temporary repairs had been made to Hollyhock and her ice breaking duties resumed.

References

External links

History USCGC Hollyhock
Hollyhock info at Boatnerd.com

Ships of the United States Coast Guard
Juniper-class seagoing buoy tenders
Ships built by Marinette Marine
2003 ships